Christopheria is a genus of flowering plants belonging to the family Gesneriaceae.

Its native range is Northern South America.

Species:
 Christopheria xantha (Leeuwenb.) J.F.Sm. & J.L.Clark

References

Gesnerioideae
Gesneriaceae genera